The 2007 Intense Football League season was the third season of the Intense Football League (IFL).  The league champions were the Louisiana Swashbucklers, who defeated the Corpus Christi Hammerheads in Intense Bowl III on August 11, 2007.  The championship game (Intense Bowl III) was the first indoor league championship in history available as a podcast.

Standings

 Green indicates clinched playoff berth
 Grey indicates best league record

Playoffs

External links
 2007 Stats

Intense Football League
Intense Football League seasons